Victoria "Vici" Max-Theurer (born 24 October 1985 in Linz, Austria) is an Austrian Olympic dressage rider. Representing Austria, she has competed at five Olympic Games (in 2004, 2008, 2012, 2016 and 2020). Her best Olympic result is 8th place achieved in the team dressage competition in 2004, while her highest individual Olympic placement is 13th place from 2012.

She has also competed at two World Equestrian Games (2006 and 2014) and at nine European Dressage Championships (2003 - 2017, 2021). She placed 5th in both special and freestyle individual competitions at the 2009 European Championships held at Windsor Castle.

In 2021, she withdrew from the Olympic competition just hours before the event because her horse had a dental problem.

She is the daughter of Elisabeth Theurer, the 1980 Olympic champion in individual dressage.

Personal bests

Notable Horses 
 Falcao - 1987 Grey Gelding (Jaquetao x Zina)
 2004 Athens Olympics - Team 8th place, Individual 20th place
 2005 European Championships - Team 10th place, Individual 21st place
 Weinrausch - 1992 Bay Hannoverian Gelding (Walt Disney x Darling)
 2003 European Championships - Individual 26th place
 Falcao OLD - 1992 Bay Oldenburg Gelding (Feiner Stern x Odienne)
 2007 European Championships - Team 8th place, Special 12th place, Freestyle 12th place
 2008 Beijing Olympics - Individual 27th place
 Augustin OLD - 2000 Bay Oldenburg Stallion (August Der Starke x Rohdiamant)
 2009 European Championships - Special 5th place, Freestyle 5th place, Team 6th place
 2012 London Olympics - Individual 13th place
 2013 European Championships - Team 6th place, Freestyle 10th place, Special 12th place
 2014 World Championships - Special 6th place, Freestyle 6th place, Team 8th place
 Blind Date - 2002 Chestnut Hannoverian Mare (Breitling W x Donnerhall)
 2015 European Championships - Team 9th place, Special 21st place
 2017 European Championships - Team 9th place, Individual 34th place
 Della Cavelleria OLD - 2003 Bay Brown Oldenburg Mare (Diamond Hit x Rubinstein I)
 2016 Rio Olympics - Individual 34th place

References

Living people
1985 births
Sportspeople from Linz
Austrian female equestrians
Austrian dressage riders
Equestrians at the 2004 Summer Olympics
Equestrians at the 2008 Summer Olympics
Equestrians at the 2012 Summer Olympics
Equestrians at the 2016 Summer Olympics
Equestrians at the 2020 Summer Olympics
Olympic equestrians of Austria